Fedotovo, located near railway station Kipelovo on a major railway to St.Petersburg, is a Russian Naval Aviation air base in Russia located 44 km west of Vologda. It is a large base for long-range aircraft, with 20 revetments in a remote area and large tarmac along parallel taxiway.  Built in 1963, Fedotovo was an unnamed military town but took on the name of the first commander of 392 ODRAP, Lt. Col. A. S. Fedotov, who was killed in an aircraft crash in 1966.  Fedotovo was a major source of Tupolev Tu-95 and Tupolev Tu-142 flights overshadowing the United States Navy Atlantic Fleet.  The base provided reconnaissance for the North Fleet Air Arm.

The base is home to the 2nd Guards Aviation Group, 5th Independent Anti-submarine Aviation Squadron which uses the Tupolev Tu-142MK/MR/MZ (ASCC: Bear).

Units stationed at Kipelovo include:
 392 ODRAP (In Russian: 392 ОДРАП - Отдельный Дальне Разведывательный Авиационный Полк - Otdyel'nyy Dal'nye Razvedyvatel'nyy Aviatsionnyy Polk = 392nd Independent Long-Range Reconnaissance Aviation Regiment) flying Tupolev Tu-95RTs (Bear-D).  It was Fedotovo's first unit, beginning operations in 1963 and serving active duty with the Northern Fleet Air Arm and tasked with monitoring the activities of Western navies in the Arctic, participating in space program splashdowns, and conducting search-and-rescue activities.  Its aircraft were deployed regularly to Cuba throughout the 1970s and to Angola and Guinea later in the decade.  A declassified CIA document written in 1977 took note of these Atlantic deployments, stating that while they had little impact on the United States, they "contribute to the threat to Western naval forces operating in the Northern Atlantic Ocean".
 76 PLAPDD (In Russian: 76 ПЛАПДД - Противо Лодочный Авиационный Полк Дальнего Действия - Protivo Lodochnyy Aviatsionnyy Polk Dal'nyego Deystviya = 76th Long Range Anti-Submarine Aviation Regiment) flying 25 Tupolev Tu-142M (Bear-F) aircraft beginning in March 1970.  Though most of its operations ane exercises tracking the United States Navy fleet took place in the Atlantic Ocean and Barents Sea, in 1976 and 1977 part of the unit participated in exercises with the Soviet Pacific Fleet and was based temporarily at its sister base Khorol.  In 1992 its personnel were deployed to India to train Indian pilots on their new Tu-142MK-E aircraft.
 135 PLAPDD (135th Long Range Anti-Submarine Aviation Regiment flying Tupolev Tu-142M and Tupolev Tu-142MR
35 PLAD (In Russian: 35 Противо Лодочный Авиационный Полк - Protivo Lodochnyy Aviatsionnyy Polk = 35th Long-Range Anti-Submarine Aviation Division) - this division grouped both regiments equipped with Tupolev Tu-142M (Bear-F) aircraft (76th and 135th PLAP DD) stationed there.

References

External links
 Garnizon Fedotovo - Russian website for veterans of the base
 Fedotovo forum - Russian forum for veterans of the base

Soviet Naval Aviation bases
Russian Navy
Installations of the Russian Navy